Tequila Works S.L. is a Spanish video game developer located in Madrid, founded in 2009 by Raúl Rubio and Luz Sancho. The company is best known for developing Deadlight and Rime.

History 

Tequila Works was founded in Madrid in 2009 by Raúl Rubio Munárriz and Luz Sancho Rodríguez. On 18 January 2012, Tequila Works announced their first project, Deadlight. Tequilla Works' next project was Rime, a puzzle video game originally intended to be a PlayStation 4-exclusive game. However, the team decided to acquire the intellectual property from Sony in the middle of the game's development and bring the game to other platforms. Rime was released in May 2017. The company also collaborated with GameTrust Games on a virtual reality project named The Invisible Hours, in which players will solve a murder mystery.

In 2017, the company partnered with British developer Cavalier Game Studios to publish Cavalier's first game, The Sexy Brutale, while providing additional development. The company also published WonderWorlds by Guildford-based start-up studio Glowmade.

In February 2019, Sony Pictures Virtual Reality announced a VR game by Tequila Works titled Groundhog Day: Like Father Like Son, which is set 26 years after Groundhog Day starring Bill Murray, planned to release later in 2019 for PSVR, Oculus Rift and HTC Vive. In May 2019, Tequila Works revealed that they have two projects in production and one in pre-production.

In March 2022, Tequila Works announced that it has received an investment from Tencent which will be used to grow the studio and develop more original IP. The investment was undisclosed and is only known to make the Chinese conglomerate a major investor into the company.

Games

References

External links 
 

Companies based in Madrid
Video game companies established in 2009
Video game companies of Spain
Video game development companies
Spanish companies established in 2009
Privately held companies of Spain